Hot Springs County High School is a high-school located in Thermopolis, Wyoming. The school is part of Hot Springs County School District Number 1 and teaches students grades 9 through 12. The school is accredited by the Wyoming State Board of Education and the North Central Association of Colleges and Schools.

References 

Education in Hot Springs County, Wyoming
Public high schools in Wyoming